"If the war comes" is a pamphlet originally prepared by the Supreme Commander of the Swedish Armed Forces' office. If the war comes has been delivered to every single household in Sweden from 1943 to 1991 and again from 2018. The most important parts of the publication were also inserted at the end of all Swedish phone books. The publication contained information about how to act in a situation of national crisis and most notably, nuclear war. Between the 1950s and 1970s Sweden went through a period with extraordinary high economic growth called the record years. This made it possible to invest in civil defense and to have a plan to save the entire population even in the event of a superpower invasion. If the war comes was a way to inform the public about these plans. With the end of the Cold War the publication was deemed to be outdated and distribution ceased in 1991. The most basic information was kept in the phone book until the early 21st century. In 2018 the pamphlet was renewed and distributed under the name "If crisis or war comes".

2018 reprint 
Due to the unstable international political situation, the Swedish government decided to distribute a new version of the pamphlet to 4.7 million Swedish households between May and June 2018. The 2018 version was titled If crisis or war comes and included information on modern situations such as terrorism, fake news and cell phone usage during a crisis.

Content 
If the war comes was a short publication and contained the basic information that the Government of Sweden considered as necessary to know in the event of war.  The most notable and well remembered exhortation is the phrase in the chapter about civil defense; Every statement that the resistance has ceased is FALSE!. The publication also contained information about civil defense sirens, how to act in an air-raid shelter and what belongings you should bring in the case of a refugee-situation.

Quotations
 "Resistance shall be made all the time and in every situation. It depends on You – Your efforts, Your determination, Your will to survive!" 
 "Sweden wants to defend itself, is able to defend itself and will defend itself! – We never give up!"
 "If Sweden is attacked by another country, we will never give up. All information to the effect that resistance is to cease is false."

Editions 

Om kriget kommer – vägledning för rikets medborgare i händelse av krig (If the war comes – guidance to the citizens of the nation in case of war), Statens Informationsstyrelse, 1943 (16 pages) 
Om kriget kommer – vägledning för Sveriges medborgare (If the war comes – guidance for the citizens of Sweden), Kungliga Civilförsvarsstyrelsen, 1952 (33 pages) 
Om kriget kommer – vägledning för Sveriges medborgare (If the war comes – guidance for the citizens of Sweden), Kungliga Civilförsvarsstyrelsen, 1961 (48 pages) 
Om kriget kommer – vad du bör veta (If the war comes – what you should know), Beredskapsnämnden för psykologiskt försvar, 1983 (39 pages) 
Om kriget kommer (If the war comes), Styrelsen för psykologiskt försvar (SPF), 1987 (31 pages) 
Om kriget eller katastrofen kommer – vad gör vi med barnen? (If war or catastrophe comes – what do we do with the children), Socialstyrelsen, 1991 (49 pages)
Om krisen eller kriget kommer – viktig information till Sveriges invånare (If crisis or war comes – important information for the population of Sweden), Myndigheten för samhällsskydd och beredskap, 2018 (20 pages)

See also 
 Protect and Survive
Free war

References

External links 
2018 edition of If crisis or war comes in English (archived copy)

Civil defense
Sweden in World War II
Pamphlets
Cold War
1943 non-fiction books